First-seeded Althea Gibson successfully defended her title, defeating Angela Mortimer in the final, 8–6, 6–2 to win the ladies' singles tennis title at the 1958 Wimbledon Championships.

Seeds

  Althea Gibson (champion)
  Christine Truman (fourth round)
  Dorothy Knode (second round)
  Maria Bueno (quarterfinals)
  Shirley Bloomer (quarterfinals)
  Zsuzsa Körmöczy (semifinals)
  Janet Hopps (second round)
  Karol Fageros (third round)

Draw

Finals

Top half

Section 1

Section 2

Section 3

Section 4

Bottom half

Section 5

Section 6

Section 7

Section 8

References

External links

Women's Singles
Wimbledon Championship by year – Women's singles
Wimbledon Championships
Wimbledon Championships